Dad Wanted is a 2020 Mexican film directed by Javier Colinas, written by Victor Avelar, Javier Colinas, Paulette Hernandez and Fernando Barreda Luna and starring Juan Pablo Medina, Ela Velden and Silvia Navarro.

Cast 
 Juan Pablo Medina as Alberto
 Natalia Coronado as Blanca Díaz
 Ela Velden as Actriz guapa
 Silvia Navarro as Fernanda
 Luis Ernesto Franco as Santiago Sánchez
 Alberto Guerra as Alberto Guerra
 Patricia Reyes Spíndola as Directora del colegio
 Rodrigo Murray as Hombre con traje
 Gonzalo Garcia Vivanco as Guapo
 Luis Arrieta as Luis Arrieta
 Marisol del Olmo as Mamá Laura
 Victoria Viera as Laura
 Roberto Quijano as Sergio
 Lisette Morelos as Recepcionista BMX
 Martha Claudia Moreno as Señora elegante
 Moisés Arizmendi as Moisés Arizmendi

References

External links
 
 

2020 films
Mexican drama films
Spanish-language Netflix original films
2020s Spanish-language films
2020s Mexican films